Zoe MacKinnon (October 5, 1959 in Toronto – January 29, 2014) was a Canadian field hockey player who competed in the 1984 Summer Olympics. MacKinnon, after surviving cancer once, lived with her partner Elizabeth Schieck in Guelph, Ontario on the Bank of the Speed River. She was also a member of the University of Toronto Hall of Fame.

References

External links
 

1959 births
2014 deaths
Canadian female field hockey players
Olympic field hockey players of Canada
Field hockey players from Toronto
Field hockey players at the 1984 Summer Olympics
Canadian LGBT sportspeople
LGBT field hockey players
20th-century Canadian LGBT people